Boiga guangxiensis is a species of snakes of the family Colubridae. It is sometimes known as the Guangxi cat snake.

Geographic range
The snake is found in southern China (Guangxi province), Laos, and Vietnam.

Habitat and behaviour
Boiga guangxiensis is a nocturnal and arboreal snake that occurs in both primary and secondary evergreen forest.

References 

guangxiensis
Snakes of Asia
Snakes of China
Reptiles of Laos
Snakes of Vietnam
Reptiles described in 1998